The 1969 Maryland Terrapins football team represented the University of Maryland in the 1969 NCAA University Division football season. In their first season under head coach Roy Lester, the Terrapins compiled a 3–7 record (3–3 in conference), finished in sixth place in the Atlantic Coast Conference, and were outscored by their opponents 249 to 100. The team's statistical leaders included Jeff Shugars with 716 passing yards, Tom Miller with 629 rushing yards, and Roland Merritt with 499 receiving yards.

Schedule

Roster

References

Maryland
Maryland Terrapins football seasons
Maryland Terrapins football